Piazza Castelnuovo is a square of Palermo. Along with the contiguous Piazza Ruggero Settimo, it forms a single urban space, commonly called Piazza Politeama, by virtue of the presence of Teatro Politeama, the second most important theatre of the city after Teatro Massimo. The square is located between Via Ruggero Settimo, Viale della Libertà and Via Dante, near the historic centre of Palermo, and represents one of the most popular city's square.

On Piazza Castelnuovo are located a structure called "Palchetto della Musica" (work of Salvatore Valenti), the monument to Carlo Cottone (work of Giovan Battista Palazzotto and Domenico Costantino), the sculptures "Nautica" (work of Mario Rutelli), "Lavoro" (work of Benedetto Civiletti) and "Senzatetto" (work of Pasquale Civiletti).

The square is named after Carlo Cottone, prince of Castelnuovo, one of the advocate of the Sicilian Constitution of 1812.

Gallery

See also 
 Piazza Ruggero Settimo
 Teatro Politeama

External links 
 Palermo Quick visit (Politeama, Massimo, Vuccirìa, piazza Marina) - visitsicily.info

Castelnuovo